The 2016 North Texas Mean Green football team represented University of North Texas in the 2016 NCAA Division I FBS football season. The Mean Green played their home games at the Apogee Stadium in Denton, Texas, and competed in the West Division of Conference USA (C–USA). They were led by first-year head coach Seth Littrell. They finished the season 5–8, 3–5 in C-USA play to finish in fourth place in the West Division. Because there were not enough 6-win bowl eligible teams, they received a bowl invitation as a 5–7 team with the highest APR score. They were invited to the Heart of Dallas Bowl where they lost to Army in overtime.

Schedule
North Texas announced its 2016 football schedule on February 4, 2016. The 2016 schedule consists of 6 home and away games in the regular season. The Mean Green will host C–USA foes Louisiana Tech, Marshall, Middle Tennessee, and Southern Miss, and will travel to Rice, UTEP, UTSA, and Western Kentucky (WKU).

The team will play four non–conference games, two home games against Bethune-Cookman from the Mid-Eastern Athletic Conference and SMU from the American Athletic Conference, and two road games against Army and Florida from the Southeastern Conference (SEC).

Schedule Source:

Game summaries

SMU

Bethune–Cookman

After falling to FCS Portland State 66–7 the previous season, the Mean Green soundly beat FCS Bethune–Cookman 41–20. Mason Fine entered the game as North Texas's quarterback midway through the 3rd quarter following an Alec Morris interception that was returned for a touchdown. Fine would later be named as the starter for the Mean Green.

at Florida

at Rice

The Mean Green traveled to Houston to open up conference play against the Rice Owls. UNT won over Rive 42–35 in double overtime after trailing 17–0. With the win, the Mean Green improved to an overall record of 2–2, and surpassed their win total from the previous season.

Middle Tennessee

Marshall

Marshall entered the game with a 76.6% win probability against North Texas, but the Mean Green came out on top over the Thundering Herd with a 38–21 victory. This is North Texas's first ever win over Marshall.

at Army

at UTSA

Louisiana Tech

at WKU

Southern Miss

at UTEP

Army–Heart of Dallas Bowl

References

North Texas
North Texas Mean Green football seasons
North Texas Mean Green football